Realmente Bella Señorita Panamá 2009 is the second edition of the beauty contest format that was created when the Señorita Panamá contest was renewed.  It was the 43rd celebration of the Miss Panama contest and the 26th Annual contest Señorita Panamá, was held at the Ascanio Arosemena Auditorium with the final night at theTihany Spectacular, Panama, Panama on Friday, May 15, 2009. The new pageant would send the winner to Miss Universe 2009.

About 10 contestants from all over the country will compete for the prestigious crown. Realmente Bella Señorita Panamá 2008 Carolina Dementiev of Panama Centro crowned Diana Broce of Los Santos as her successor at the end of the event as the new Señorita Panamá.

This year there was a new change, in the same night was celebrated the final competition entitled "Señorita Panamá Mundo" was announced the winner of the Señorita Panamá Mundo title. Giselle Bissot Señorita Panamá World 2006 of Panama Centro crowned Nadege Herrera of Panama Centro as her successor at the end of the event. The First Runner up to Miss Continente Americano 2009.

Final Result

Special Awards

Jury
Carolina Dementiev - Realmente Bella Señorita Panamá 2008
María Sofía Velásquez - Señorita Panamá 1993
Miguel Herrera

Candidates

Candidates Notes
Diana Broce won the Best National Costume in Miss Universe 2009.
Nadege Herrera was top 7 (5th) in Miss World 2009, also was Finalist in Miss World Beach Beauty (1RUp), Top Model and Best Designer.
Lidia McNulty was Miss Supranational Panama 2011 and place in the top 20 in Miss Supranational 2011.
Giosue Cozzarelli represented Panama in Miss All Nations 2010.

References

External links
Official Website
  Señorita Panamá  official website

Señorita Panamá
2009 beauty pageants
2009 in Panama